Quinn Slobodian (born 1978) is a Canadian historian of modern Germany and international history who has been Marion Butler McLean Professor of the History of Ideas at Wellesley College since 2022. He previously was a Residential Fellow at the Weatherhead Center for International Affairs, Harvard University in 2017–8.

Slobodian studied history at Lewis & Clark College, graduating in 2000, and was awarded his PhD by New York University in 2008.

Publications
 Crack-Up Capitalism: Market Radicals and the Dream of a World Without Democracy, New York: Metropolitan, April 2023
 Globalists: The End of Empire and the Birth of Neoliberalism, Cambridge, MA: Harvard University Press, April 2018.
 Foreign Front: Third World Politics in Sixties West Germany, Durham, NC: Duke University Press, March 2012.

As editor:
 Market Civilizations: Neoliberals East and South, with Dieter Plehwe, New York: Zone, April 2020.
 Nine Lives of Neoliberalism, with Dieter Plehwe and Philip Mirowski, New York and London: Verso, January 2020.
 Comrades of Color: East Germany in the Cold War World, New York: Berghahn Books, December 2015.

Globalists: The End of Empire and the Birth of Neoliberalism 
In Globalists: The End of Empire and the Birth of Neoliberalism, Quinn Slobodian examines the evolution of the ideas and political advocacy of neoliberalism, focusing on several historical shifts during the 20th century. The author's particular focus is a set of intellectuals like Friedrich von Hayek and Ludwig von Mises, members of what he calls the Geneva School of neoliberalism, alongside lesser-known characters of the neoliberal thought. In this process, Slobodian explains how principles of neoliberalism developed; meanwhile, liberals struggled to defend the global operation of the price mechanism from the threats of mass democracy, the disintegration of European empires and attempts to plan the world economy.

Throughout the book, Quinn Slobodian states that neoliberalism, according to his perspective, is actually a philosophy less of economics and more a doctrine of ordering, of creating the institutions that provide for the reproduction of the totality. He states that “the Austrian German schools of neoliberals believed in a kind of invisible world economy that cannot be captured in numbers and figures and always eludes human comprehension”.

The author proposes that the goal of neoliberalism is not one of raising the standard of living per se, but rather one of systemic interdependence that would always imply some level of economic inequality. Neoliberals seek to create institutions that regulate and protect the market from human irrationality. According to Hayek, we have to give ourselves over to the forces of the market or the whole thing will stop working. Hayek views the market as an institution that needs to be embedded in others in order to have a meaning.

The book is about a series of concrete institutions self-consciously designed to withstand threats to the world economy. Broadly speaking, the book narrates the movements, from 1920 to the 1990s, that threatened but also helped to redesign the state and super state institutions.

Walter Lippmann Colloquium (1938) 
The Lippmann Colloquium was a conference of intellectuals organized in Paris in August 1938. After interest in classical liberalism had declined in the 1920s and 1930s, the aim was to construct a new liberalism as a rejection of collectivism, socialism and laissez-faire liberalism. In other words, the Lippmann Colloquium had the objective to establish, through a normative framework, common and binding rules, as well as means to take into account human needs that the market could not satisfy.

The term “neoliberalism” was coined during this conference. According to Globalists, neoliberalism was originally defined as a group of people that exchange ideas under the same intellectual framework.

In 1924, John Maynard Keynes declared the end of the laissez faire. He believed in the necessity of an interventionist State in order to protect capitalism. On the other hand, Walter Lippmann was against these ideas. Lippmann's book, An Inquiry into the Principles of the Good Society, did not focus on factual or economic, but instead focused on political and sociological aspects of liberalism. Lippmann's work is a synthesis of Hayek's principles, like the new perspective of the rule of law. Hayek believed that economists confused the difference between the things they knew and the things the average economic actor in the world actually knew. Accordingly, in order to have an equilibrium there must be full knowledge of the causes and consequences. Meaning, that for Hayek perfect markets did not exist, because perfect knowledge is impossible. For him, the only thing that causes equilibrium is some people about certain topics.

Debates 
During the 1930s, the neoliberal movement emerged in Europe as a legal project, rather than an economic movement. There was an urge to see political and economic areas as a whole, because the global economy needed political plans of action. Paradoxically, neoliberalism sought non-intervention through intervention. (Foucault)

Another popular moment of the decade was economic nationalism, which implemented protectionist measures, quality standards. This movement was commonly used in some parts of Europe and later on in the global periferia. Neoliberals viewed economic nationalism as serious problem because it was an obstacle of the free market. According to neoliberal perspective, the problem rooted from the tension between the idea of self determination (Woodrow Wilson) and the laissez faire.

The End of Empires 
By the beginning of the 20th it was evident that some of the great empires were doomed to fail and the era of empires was slowly coming to an end. Neoliberal had mixed points of view, some condemned empires for having exclusive relations between metropolises and the colonies, while others applauded empires (Britain and Austria) for maintaining free market conditions and stability among the different nationalities. Neoliberals were in favor of the process of decolonization but without the protectionist policies. Economists, like Hayek and Lionel Robbins, proposed the creation of a supranational federation where every nation had the right to create their own cultural policies but had the obligation to respect the free market. Neoliberals, like Robbins, believed that decolonization was a  very conflicting process because the disintegration of empires meant the confusion between government and property.

In his article, New Commonwealth Quarterly, Hayek proposed that decolonization could finally mean the separation of politic and economic, but under a national structure it was easier to adquare protectionist measures.  Therefore, Hayek proposed the construction of a supranational organization that prevented these actions and helped to build globalism and democracies with defined and limited powers.

Rights

Neoliberals promoted “xenos rights” that, according to Hayek, suggested the assurance of “individual admission and protection within an alien territory”. These rights are based on the framework of dominium but need the political institutions of imperium to ensure them.

The unconstrained expansion of democracy was a postwar problem. The “one person one vote” problem became “one country one vote” at the UN. Neoliberals, after the war, started thinking that they won the war but started losing the peace; engaging in short-term “wars of movement”.

According to the author, the Bretton Woods system was born incomplete. It should have 3 institutions: The International Monetary Fund (IMF) had to make low-interest loans and regulate exchange rates. The World Bank had to support the reconstruction of European nations and then the global South. And the International Trade Organization (ITO) the ITO was supposed to regulate trade relations. International Chamber of Commerce (ICC) opposed to the ITO. The ITO debate created a rift between the nations of the global North and South, but this was due more to the influence of the ICC than to the role of the US. The US was initially willing to support the South, but was attacked by reactionaries from the Geneva school and big companies.

Philip Cortney, member of the ICC and the National Association of Manufacturers (NAM) criticized ITO in The Economic Munich. In his document he adds as a human right the exchange of currencies in peacetime and equates the right to human migration with the right to capital migration. It also called for a global constitution to protect capital worldwide.

During the 1950s, with the expropriation of Iranian oil, it became increasingly important for companies the existence of  regulations on property rights at the international level. In 1957, San Francisco  International Industrial Development Conference  gave a speech on the protection of capital at the international level, and would later be called the “Capitalist Magna Carta”: which seeks to open the debate on the rights of the investor.

References 

Living people
1978 births
21st-century Canadian historians
Wellesley College faculty
Harvard University staff
Canadian expatriate academics in the United States